The dreadnought was the predominant type of battleship in the early 20th century.

Dreadnought may also refer to:

Ships 
 English ship Dreadnought (1573), a 41-gun ship
 HMS Dreadnought (1654), a 52-gun third-rate ship of the line
 HMS Dreadnought (1691), a 60-gun fourth-rate ship of the line
 HMS Dreadnought (1742), a 60-gun fourth-rate ship of the line 
 HMS Dreadnought (1801), a 98-gun second-rate
 Dreadnought (clipper), a three-masted medium clipper ship that sailed for the Red Cross Line of New York and Liverpool packets (see List of clipper ships)
 HMS Dreadnought (1875), a battleship
 HMS Dreadnought (1906), a revolutionary "all big gun" battleship
 HMS Dreadnought (S101), a nuclear-powered submarine launched in 1960
 USS Dreadnought (SP-584), a patrol boat in commission from 1917 to 1919
Dreadnought-class submarine - the planned replacements for the UK Trident deterrent fleet

Literature 
 Dreadnought (book), a 1991 book by Robert K. Massie
 Workers' Dreadnought, a newspaper of the suffragettes
 Dreadnought: a History of the Modern Battleship, a 1975 book by Richard Hough
 Dreadnought, a 2010 alternate history steampunk novel by Cherie Priest
The Lost Fleet: Beyond The Frontier: Dreadnought, a novel in Jack Campbell's The Lost Fleet series
 Dreadnought, a 2017 superhero novel by April Daniels (author)

Film and television 
 "Dreadnought" (Star Trek: Voyager), an episode of Star Trek: Voyager
 Under Siege or Dreadnought, a Steven Seagal film

Rail 
 Dreadnought, a GWR 3031 Class locomotive between 1891 and 1915
 The Lancashire & Yorkshire Railway Class 8 locomotives were nicknamed Dreadnoughts
The Lancashire & Yorkshire Railway Hughes 4-6-4T tank engines were called Dreadnought tanks
 Dreadnought, a type of suburban railway carriage used on the Metropolitan Railway and London Underground between 1910 and the early 1960s
 Dreadnaught wheel, a wheel with articulated rails attached at the rim to provide a firm footing

Other uses 
 Dreadnought hoax, a 1910 English hoax when members of the Bloomsbury Group visited a British battleship disguised as the Emperor of Abyssinia and entourage
 Dreadnought (naval wargame), a 1975 wargame published by Simulations Publications, Inc.
 Dreadnoughts (game), a 1992 videogame
 Dreadnought (video game), a combat flight simulator video game
 Dreadnought (comics)
 Star Dreadnought, a type of star destroyer in the Star Wars films 
 Dreadnought (guitar type)
 Portsmouth Dreadnoughts, an American Football team currently based in Portsmouth, England
 Mullahoran GFC Dreadnoughts, a GAA club based in Cavan, Ireland
 The Dreadnoughts,  a Canadian folk punk band
 Wakefield Trinity, an English rugby league football club nicknamed "The Dreadnoughts"
 Dreadnought Galaxy, a fictional galaxy from the video game Super Mario Galaxy

See also 
 Dreadnoks
 Dreadnaught (disambiguation)
 Dreadnoughtus, dinosaur genus